Glen Merlyn Bagnell (born February 15, 1936) is a Canadian politician. He represented the electoral district of Dartmouth North in the Nova Scotia House of Assembly from 1970 to 1978. He is a member of the Nova Scotia Liberal Party.

Bagnell was born in Truro, Nova Scotia. He attended Acadia University and Dalhousie University and was a pharmacist. He married Shirley Joan Smith in 1957.

Bagnell first attempted to enter provincial politics in a November 1968 by-election in Dartmouth North, but was defeated by Progressive Conservative Gerald Wambolt by 76 votes. He ran again in the 1970 election, and defeated Wambolt by almost 1,800 votes. Bagnell was re-elected in the 1974 election. Bagnell served in the Executive Council of Nova Scotia as Minister of Mines, Minister of Environment, Minister of Tourism, Minister of Consumer Affairs, and Minister of Municipal Affairs. He was defeated by Progressive Conservative Laird Stirling when he ran for re-election in the 1978 election.

References

1936 births
Living people
Acadia University alumni
Canadian pharmacists
Dalhousie University alumni
Members of the Executive Council of Nova Scotia
Nova Scotia Liberal Party MLAs
People from Dartmouth, Nova Scotia
People from Truro, Nova Scotia